Antonio Berti (20 June 1812, in Venice – 1879) was an Italian politician and senator. Berti was born into a wealthy family in Venice. He soon moved to Treviso where he managed two mills.

References

1812 births
1879 deaths
Politicians from Venice